Robinsonekspedisjonen: 2007, was the seventh season of the Norwegian version of the Swedish show Expedition Robinson and it premiered on 9 September 2007 and aired until 2 December 2007. As this was the first season of Robinson to air since its initial cancellation in 2007, the producers decided to take the show back to its roots. However, there were a few twists throughout the season, the first being that the eighteen initial contestants were forced to compete in an endurance competition before they were split into teams. The two contestants to quit the competition first were eliminated. The next twist came in episode two in which a joker, Linni Meister, entered the game. In episode four, Merete Svenningdal was voted as the least deserving person to win the game by her fellow South team members. Following the vote, Merete was moved to the North team. Following Gunnar Norbeck's evacuation in episode eleven, Peter Arambasic, who had been eliminated in a challenge just prior to the merge, returned to the game in his place. Norbeck was eventually eliminated in a duel against Anne-Grete. In episode thirteen, Kenneth and Vibeke had to compete in a duel in order to determine who would return to the game. Ultimately, it was Ann-Kristin Otnes who won the season with a jury vote of 5-3 over Anne-Grete Strand.

Finishing order

External links
http://www.aftenbladet.no/underholdning/tv/article557419.ece
http://nutria.msn.no/specials/robinson/deltagere.aspx?id=18

 2007
2007 Norwegian television seasons